Forbidden Island is a 1959 American adventure crime film directed by Charles B. Griffith starring Jon Hall. It was his debut as director, although he had directed second unit on Attack of the Crab Monsters. A young Don Preston from the Mothers of Invention  appeared in this film.

Plot
A freelance frogman (Jon Hall) is hired by a psychotic treasure hunter to recover an emerald that went down in a shipwreck.

Cast
 Jon Hall as Dave Courtney
 Nan Adams as Joanne Godfrey
 John Farrow as Edward Stuart Godfrey
 Jonathan Haze as Jack Mautner
 Greigh Phillips as Dean Pike
 Dave "Howdy" Peters as Fermin Fry
 Tookie Evans as Raul Estoril
 Martin Denny as Marty
 Bob La Varre as Cal Priest
 Bill Anderson as Mike
 Abraham Kaluna as Abe

Production
Griffith had signed with Columbia under a five-film writer-producer-director contract; he ended up only making two of them, the other being Ghost of the China Sea, which he did not direct.

"They were really terrible," he recalled later. "It stopped me for twenty years from ever directing again. They were really rank. You see, I got chicken and started to write very safely within a formula to please the major studios, and of course, you can't do that."

The film was shot mostly on location in Hawaii. Filming started November 4, 1957.
Photos have been found in the archives of Silver Springs State Park, Florida, indicating that some scenes were filmed there.
Rebecca Welles was originally cast in the lead role but had to pull out and was replaced by Nan Adams.

"I had an early chance to direct but was too dumb to know that I had to work with the editor," Griffith said later. "They told me I had an Oscar-winning editor; I told them we needed an Oscar-winning firestarter."

The two films were meant to cost $150,000. Forbidden Island was meant to be filmed in ten days but Griffith went over schedule. According to Variety "Columbia noted that Griffith seemed to be having continuing production difficulties" and sent out one of its contract directors, Fred Sears, to direct the second movie.

References

External links

Forbidden Island at TCMDB
Forbidden Island Movie Poster 
Forbidden Island in ʻColumbia Pictures Horrorʻ by Michael R. Pitts at Google Books
Review of movie at Variety

1959 adventure films
Treasure hunt films
Underwater action films
Films directed by Charles B. Griffith
Films with screenplays by Charles B. Griffith
1950s English-language films
American adventure films
American crime films
1950s American films